Mirzapur Union is a union in Sreemangal Upazila of Moulvibazar District in the Sylhet Division of Bangladesh.

Area & Population 
Area
The total area of this union is about 11,793 acres.

Population
Its total population is 23,944, of which 12,316 are males and 11,628 are females (ref: according to the 2001 census report conducted by the Bangladesh Bureau of Statistics).

Public representative 
The current chairman Md Sufi Miah.

Industries 
The famous Bangladeshi Tea Brand Ispahani's factory is located here in this Mirzapur union.

References

Unions of Sreemangal Upazila